is a Japanese manga artist, film director and novelist. As a manga writer, he is best known for the series Be-Bop High School, which won the 1988 Kodansha Manga Award for the general category and was adapted as series of live-action movies and as a 7 episode anime OVA series. He was director of one segment of Killers.

Manga series
 Be-Bop High School (1983 – 2003)
 Saru Banchō (1996 – 1997)
 MI-4 (1998 – 1999)

Films
 Karurosu (1991)
 Be-Bop High School (1994)
 Joker (1996)
 Tetsu to Namari (1997)
 Kyōhansha (1999)
 Pay Off (Killers) (2003)
 Out and Out (2018)

Novels
, 2004 (Film: Shield of Straw, directed by Takashi Miike, 2013)
English translation: Shield of Straw, translated by Asumi Shibata, Vertical, 2016
, 2007
English translation: A Dog in Water, translated by Maya Rosewood, Vertical, 2013
, 2009
, 2010
, 2011
, 2012
, 2013

References

External links 
  
 Profile at The Ultimate Manga Site 
 Kazuhiro Kiuchi at Vertical Inc

1960 births
Living people
People from Fukuoka
Manga artists from Fukuoka Prefecture
Winner of Kodansha Manga Award (General)
Japanese film directors
20th-century Japanese novelists
21st-century Japanese novelists
Japanese crime fiction writers